is a Japanese manga series written and illustrated by Marimo Ragawa.

Synopsis
Cain Walker, a police officer in New York City, is gay but remains closeted. He engages in a series of one night stands in the city's gay bars until he meets Mel Fredericks, with whom he decides to pursue a relationship. The series follows their often tumultuous relationship as they confront a variety of challenges, including sexual assault, marriage, parenting, and HIV/AIDS.

Characters

A 25-year-old police officer at the New York City Police Department (NYPD). Born in Newton, Massachusetts, he moved to Queens in order to work as a police officer. He is gay, but closeted.

A 22-year-old barista born and raised in Upper Manhattan. He was raised by his aunt after his mother committed suicide, but left the home after being sexually abused by his uncle while in high school.

A former colleague of Cain's who became involved in smuggling heroin.

The chief of the NYPD, and Cain's boss.

Media

Manga
The series, which was developed by author Marimo Ragawa after a visit to New York City, was serialized in the manga magazine Hana to Yume from 1995 to 1998. It was subsequently collected by Hakusensha as four  volumes in 1998, and later re-published as two  volumes in 2003, featuring essays by manga scholar Yukari Fujimoto and author Satoru Ito. An English-language translation of the series published by Yen Press was originally slated for release in October 2021. However, it was delayed until March 2022.

Audio drama

Reception and analysis
In Manga: Sixty Years of Japanese Comics, writer Paul Gravett describes New York New York as a "moving, 700-page melodrama," praising its thriller elements and its realistic depiction of gay identity. Mark McLelland of the University of Wollongong similarly notes that in contrast to "pre-political"  of the 1990s that typically focused on romance to the exclusion of sexual identity, New York New York is notable as among the first  manga to depict social realism in its treatment of gay identity through its portrayal of homophobia, coming out, gay bashing, sexual abuse, and rape. He commends the series for its attempt "to refer to the very real social problems in which same-sex desire is grounded," but writes that the sentimental and melodramatic nature of the story "works against a realistic interpretation of the narrative."

Mel assumes the role traditionally occupied by women in heterosexual romance fiction: he is physically weak, subordinated, emotional, and repeatedly the victim of crimes from which he is saved by his lover. McLelland argues that Mel consequently exists to serve as a figure of identification for the  genre's largely female readership.

See also
 Fake (manga)

References

Further reading

External links
 

1995 manga
Comics set in the 1990s
Comics set in New York City
Crime in anime and manga
Hakusensha manga
LGBT in anime and manga
New York City in fiction
Rape in fiction
Shōjo manga
Yen Press titles